Željko Kuzmić (born 2 November 1984) is a Serbian professional football goalkeeper.

He had previously played for the Serbian Superliga club FK Smederevo along with the clubs Saint-George SA in Ethiopia and with FK Velež Mostar in Premier League of Bosnia and Herzegovina.

On 14 January 2020, Kuzmić signed with Hong Kong club Tai Po for a half year, with an option to extend for a further year.

References

External links
 Profile and stats at Srbijafudbal
 Željko Kuzmić at Footballdatabase

1984 births
Living people
Sportspeople from Smederevo
Association football goalkeepers
Serbian footballers
Serbian expatriate footballers
FK Železnik players
FK Dubočica players
FK Mornar players
Kania Gostyń players
FK Smederevo players
Serbian SuperLiga players
FK Pobeda players
Expatriate footballers in North Macedonia
Serbian expatriate sportspeople in North Macedonia
Expatriate footballers in Poland
Serbian expatriate sportspeople in Poland
Saint George S.C. players
Expatriate footballers in Ethiopia
Expatriate footballers in Hong Kong
Serbian expatriate sportspeople in Hong Kong
FK Velež Mostar players
OFK Titograd players
FK Rudar Prijedor players
Tai Po FC players